"I Am the Bullgod" is a song by Kid Rock, first released in 1993 on the vinyl release of The Polyfuze Method, and later appearing on his 1998 breakout album Devil Without a Cause.

Composition
"I Am the Bullgod", according to AXS, was a tribute to the band Monster Magnet. The song's composition has been described as rap metal, rap rock, stoner rock and Southern rock with elements of funk. It has been described as a cross between Alice in Chains and Public Enemy.

Release history
The song first appeared on the vinyl release of The Polyfuze Method, followed by a 1993 vinyl single under the name Fire It Up, which was released as an extended play on cassette and compact disc. In 1998, the vocals were re-recorded for Kid Rock's fourth studio album, Devil Without a Cause, where one line was changed in the song ("I would like to learn but I can't be taught" to "You can bid all day but I can't be bought").

This version of the song is featured in the EA Sports American football video game Madden NFL 10.

1993 single

Track listings

1998 single

Track listing

Charts

Personnel
Kid Rock – vocals, guitars, sequencing, bass, percussion
Bob Ebeling – drums
Andrew Nehra – guitar, bass, guiro, backing vocals
Michael Nehra – solo guitar on "I Am the Bullgod"
Chris Peters – guitar loop on "I Am the Bullgod"
Mike E. Clark – loop on "The Cramper"
Jon Slow – flute on "The Cramper"
Dave Seymour – background guitar licks on "A Country Boy Can Survive"
Prince Vince and Wes Chill – featured on "Rollin' On the Island"

References

1993 singles
1998 singles
Kid Rock songs
Rap rock songs
Southern rock songs
Stoner rock songs
Songs written by Kid Rock
1993 EPs
Atlantic Records singles